is a railway station in Sumida, Tokyo, Japan, operated by East Japan Railway Company (JR East) and Tokyo Metro. The surrounding area is the largest shopping district in Sumida Ward, featuring several large department stores, numerous small shops and restaurants.

Lines
Kinshichō Station is served by the JR East Sōbu Line (Rapid) and Chūō-Sōbu Line, as well as the Tokyo Metro Hanzōmon Line (Station number Z-13).

Station layout

JR East platforms

Tokyo Metro platforms

History
The station first opened on 9 December 1894. The Hanzōmon Line station opened on 19 March 2003.

The station facilities of the Hanzōmon Line were inherited by Tokyo Metro after the privatization of the Teito Rapid Transit Authority (TRTA) in 2004.

Passenger statistics
In fiscal 2013, the JR East station was used by 103,522 passengers daily (boarding passengers only), making it the 36th-busiest station operated by JR East. In fiscal 2013, the Tokyo Metro station was used by an average of 92,658 passengers per day (exiting and entering passengers), making it the 41st-busiest station operated by Tokyo Metro. The daily passenger figures for each operator in previous years are as shown below.

 Note that JR East figures are for boarding passengers only.

Surrounding area
 Kinshi Park
 Sumida Triphony Hall (concert hall)

See also

 List of railway stations in Japan

References

External links

 JR East station information 
 Tokyo Metro station information 

Railway stations in Japan opened in 1894
Sōbu Main Line
Chūō-Sōbu Line
Tokyo Metro Hanzomon Line
Stations of East Japan Railway Company
Stations of Tokyo Metro
Railway stations in Tokyo